Tri Tac Games is a publisher of role-playing games based in Pontiac, Michigan. The company is built primarily on the work of Richard Tucholka, its founder and president.

Company history
Tri Tac Games was founded in 1978 as "Tacky Tack Games". Tri Tac is one of several small companies that rode the wave of interest in RPGs beginning in the 1970s with TSR's Dungeons & Dragons.

The company's first product was the humorous microgame Geriatric Wars. It was followed by: Fringeworthy, the first interdimensional travel RPG; Bureau 13: Stalking the Night Fantastic, a late 20th Century Horror RPG; and FTL:2448, a space RPG.  All three were created by Tucholka. The company name was changed to "Tri Tac Games" to reflect what the company saw as the more serious nature of its new products.

Currently the company sells a number of games and books, including a book of cartoons and a cookbook called Damn Strange Recipe Collection. It has reincorporated as Tri Tac Games, LLC, and its owner is Richard Tucholka's widow, Melody Natcher.

In 1994 the Tri Tac offices were raided by the FBI, because of alleged similarities between promotional ID badges distributed by Tri Tac personnel and certain official U.S. government ID badges. After the raid, the federal prosecutor assigned to the case elected not to press charges. A year later the FBI visited the Tri Tac booth at Gen Con 95 to see if Tri Tac was distributing similar ID badges. Tri Tac was no longer selling the badges but they did display one of the controversial badges. It was sealed in a frame with a newspaper report about the raid. The FBI determined Tri Tac presented no threat to national security and left without comment.

After Tucholka's passing in 2017, his wife, Melody Natcher, took over as the owner of Tri Tac Games and has released several of the games, some with complete make overs such as Hard Wired Hinterland, and others just spelling and grammar corrections.

Current games
These are the current games:
Bureau 13
Bureau 13: Stalking the Night Fantastic
Bureau 13 Adventures: Hellsnight, Haunts, The Lost Files, Vols 1 & 2 
Bureau 13: Black Powder 1859-1889
Bureau 13: Scenes for Horror, Industry and Adventure
Bureau 13: Special Edition by Pollotta & Tucholka
Bureau 13: d20 EDITION
Bureau 13: SCREAMS IN THE NIGHT (Outpost/Tritac)
Bureau 13: ALIENS AMONG US (Outpost/Tritac
Bureau 13: STALKING THE STEEL CITY (Outpost/Tritac
Bureau 13: EXTREME
Bureau 13: BRASS & STEAM (2012)

Hardwired Hinterland
Hardwired Hinterland

Fringeworthy
Fringeworthy
Fringeworthy d20
Rogue 417
Cloisters
Invasion US
Weirdzone 
Catalogue of Alternative Worlds
Catalogue of Alternative Worlds II
Catalogue of Alternative Worlds III
Weirdzone
Space RPGs
FTL:2448
Incursion II Canadians Across the Galactic Empire
Incursion
EZ SPACE 2012
Microgames
Cosmic Wow!
Baby Boomer
Geriatric Wars
Escape from Westerville State
Drive By
War on High
Viral Vegetable Wars
The Hunt for Bread in October

Duck Wars
Duck Trooper
Polywumpus
Pterroductyl

Clay squash classics
Monster Squash
Mec Squash
Bug Squash
Mutant Squash
Japanese Monster Squash
Panzer Squash
People Squash

Other
Beach Bunny Bimbos with Blasters
Guests: An Invasion of the Earth Supplement
Holes: Wild Miniatures Combat
DM's Book of Nasty Tricks & Misfit Magic

References

External links

Role-playing game publishing companies